Redland High School for Girls was a selective and independent, non-denominational girls' school in the suburb of Redland, Bristol, England. The school merged with The Red Maids' School in May 2016, with the new merged school named Redmaids' High School and based at the Red Maids' site from September 2017 in Westbury-on-Trym.

Admissions

Redland High School admitted girls aged 3–18 years and also boys aged 3–6 from 2014–17.

History 
Redland High School  was founded in 1882. Early governors of Redland's school included Agnes Beddoe, Elizabeth and Emily Sturge who were leading suffragists and campaigners for women's higher education in Victorian times. The senior school was housed in an old manor-house known as Redland Court which dates from 1732-35. It was built by John Strachan for John Cossins and was designated by English Heritage as a grade II* listed building, which underwent many extensions. In October 2006, a building previously belonging to the Junior School was converted into the Music School, expanding the senior school once again. In 2014, they opened an Early Years Foundation Stage Building in conjunction with nearby boys school, QEH.

The school was spread across five sites: the Senior school, on Redland Court Road; the Music School, also on Redland Court Road; the Junior School, opposite the Senior school; the Sixth form house, on Woodstock Road; and the PE field at Golden Hill.

Following the closure of the school, the Senior School site, along with the Sixth Form House / Bursary was sold, partially demolished and turned into housing now known as Redland Court. The Junior School site in Grove Park was turned into a day nursery and the Music School converted into a wellness centre and medical clinic

Houses
During the late 60s the House system was abandoned. Prior to that there had been 6 houses named after former benefactors (Elizabeth Cocks, Gamble, Percival, Urijah Thomas, Gilmore Barnet and Tait). There were regular house competitions including drama, music, and sports. The drama competitions took a whole day. Members of years 7-9 acted while the older pupils directed, did lighting, make up and costumes.
The new house system was in place from 2003, and there were four houses. These were Maple (red), Chestnut (yellow), Willow (green) and Rowan  (blue). House captains were elected by each house respectively from Year 13. There were also two House Vice-captains from Year 12 and two sports captains from Year 10. In addition, a member of staff served as Head of House on a permanent, unelected basis.

Uniform
Between 1975 and 1986, the winter uniform was a bottle green wrap skirt,  bottle green jumper or cardigan,  white shirt and bottle green tie. Green mackintosh and optional green hat, regulation brown outdoor and indoor shoes from a range of 5 specified styles from Clarks.
Summer uniform up to year three was a white and green candy striped knee-length short sleeve cotton dress,  fourth and fifth years could choose between green and white candy stripe,  yellow and green tartan or green paisley cotton. Games uniform was a white aertex shirt and grey flannel kilt.
All uniform to be bought from Marshes department store on Whiteladies Road.

From around 2003 to the school's closure, the senior school uniform consisted of a green blazer, blue jumper, white shirt and a kilt in the school's own tartan.  The junior school uniform was similar, but with a tartan pinafore dress instead of a kilt, and a light blue shirt. At this time, the uniform had to be bought from John Lewis at Cribbs Causeway.

Sixth Formers wore their own clothes.

Headmistresses
 Miss Elizabeth Cocks 1882-1907
 Miss Emily Shekleton 1907-1920
 Miss Ella Mary Edghill 1921-1926
 Miss Clara Millicent Taylor 1926-1940
 Miss Alick Berwick 1940-1944
 Miss Sylvia Peters 1945-1968
 Miss Storm Hume 1969-1985
 Miss Eunice Hobbs 1986-1989
 Mrs Carol Lear 1989-2002
 Dr Ruth Weeks 2002-2006
 Mrs Caroline Bateson 2006-2015
 Miss Stephanie Ferro 2015-2016
 Mrs Perdita Davidson 2016-2017

Notable former students
 Beryl Corner (9 December 1910 – 4 March 2007) was the first paediatrician in the south-west of England and one of the British founders of neonatology, the care of newborn babies; she was also the last survivor of a group of women paediatricians whose achievements helped to break down barriers to the advancement of women in medicine.
 Sara Wheeler (20 March 1961–) is a travel writer. After being a pupil at Redland High she went on to study Classics and Modern Languages at Brasenose College, University of Oxford. After writing about her travels on the Greek island of Euboea and in Chile, she was accepted by the US National Science Foundation as their first female writer-in-residence at the South Pole and spent seven months in Antarctica.
 Nazneen Rahman leads research directed at identifying, characterising, and clinically implementing genes that predispose to cancer. She was awarded the No.3 spot in BBC Radio 4's Woman’s Hour 2014 Power List in recognition of her work.
 Tanya Louise Beckett (20 July 1966–) is an English television and radio journalist.
 Dame Elisabeth Anne Marian Frost Hoodless (11 February 1941–) was the Executive Director (1975 – 2011) of Community Service Volunteers (CSV), a United Kingdom volunteering and training charity.
 Sophie Anderton, Glamour Model
 Sally Beauman formerly Kinsey-Miles author of Rebecca's Tale (1944-2016)
See :Category:People educated at Redland High School for Girls

See also
 List of direct grant grammar schools

References

External links 
 

Defunct schools in Bristol
Educational institutions established in 1882
Grade II* listed buildings in Bristol
Grade II* listed educational buildings
1882 establishments in England